Michele Piccolo (born 1 September 1985) is an Italian footballer who plays as a forward for San Colombano (as of the 2017–18 season).

Career

A.C. Milan
Born in Badia Polesine, Veneto, Piccolo started his career at Veneto club Padova, about 50 km to his born place. In September 2002, he joined Milan youth teams. He played his first and only match for A.C. Milan first team on 24 May 2003, the last Serie A match of the season and the match before 2003 UEFA Champions League Final and 2003 Coppa Italia Final. In the match, he partnered with Alessandro Matri and neither one scored. The match ended with 2-4 lost to Piacenza as Milan almost rested all the regular starter.

In the next season, he played all the time at Primavera (U20) Team and not played in the first team. In 2004-05 season, he left on loan to Prato of Serie C1 along with Matri but in mid-season joined Pizzighettone at Serie C2.

Pizzighettone
Piccolo joined Pizzighettone in January 2005 and followed the team promoted to Serie C1 in 2005. He played 28 league matches and scored 6 goals in 2005–06 Serie C1 season and the club decided to sign him in co-ownership deal in 2006, for a peppercorn fee of €1,000. In 2006-07 season, Piccolo only played 8 league matches. After the club relegated back to Serie C2 at the end of season, the club sign him permanently from Milan. Piccolo then played 42 league matches in two seasons and followed the club relegated to Serie D (non-professional) in 2009.

Fiorenzuola
Piccolo joined Fiorenzuola of Serie D in 2011-2012 and 2014-2015 season.

Pro Piacenza
Piccolo joined BP Pro Piacenza of Serie D in 2012-2013 and 2014-2015 season.

Vigor Carpaneto
Piccolo joined Vigor Carpaneto of Eccellenza in 2015-2016 season, where it remained until January.

Crema 1908
Piccolo joined Crema 1908 of Eccellenza in 2015-2016 season from January to the end of the championship.

Nibbiano & Valtidone
Piccolo joined Nibbiano & Valtidone of Eccellenza in Emilia-Romagna in 2016-2017 season.

San Colombano
Piccolo joined San Colombano of Eccellenza in Lombardia in 2017-2018 season.

References

External links
 Profile at FIGC 
  
 
 LaSerieD.com 

Italian footballers
Italy youth international footballers
A.C. Milan players
A.C. Prato players
A.S. Pizzighettone players
A.S. Pro Piacenza 1919 players
Serie A players
Association football forwards
Sportspeople from the Province of Rovigo
1985 births
Living people
Footballers from Veneto